Jack Saunders is a professional Australian Rules Football player who most recently played for the Hawthorn Football Club in the Australian Football League (AFL). He was recruited from Norwood in South Australia. He has also played for Box Hill Hawks in the Victorian Football League.

Early life

Saunders played his junior football at Walkerville and the Unley jets, before  moving to Norwood in the SANFL. He attended Prince Alfred College.

AFL career 

Statistics 
Updated to the end of the 2022 season.

|-
| 2021 ||  || 43
| 0 || — || — || — || — || — || — || — || — || — || — || — || — || — || — || 0
|-
| 2022 ||  || 43
| 1 || 1 || 0 || 3 || 4 || 7 || 1 || 1 || 1.0 || 0.0 || 3.0 || 4.0 || 7.0 || 1.0 || 1.0 || 0
|- class="sortbottom"
! colspan=3| Career
! 1 !! 1 !! 0 !! 3 !! 4 !! 7 !! 1 !! 1 !! 1.0 !! 0.0 !! 3.0 !! 4.0 !! 7.0 !! 1.0 !! 1.0 !! 0
|}

References

External links

Hawthorn Football Club players
Box Hill Football Club players
Norwood Football Club players
2002 births
Living people
People educated at Prince Alfred College